Last Flight Home is the debut solo studio album by Todd Sucherman, who has been the drummer for Styx since 1995. It was released on May 2, 2020. There are official videos for "Last Flight Home", "The Damage", "Ad Lib Everything", and "Kindling" available on Todd Sucherman's YouTube channel. The album closer is a cover of the song "Kindling" by Elbow.

Track listing

Personnel 
 Todd Sucherman – vocals, background vocals, drums, loops and percussion
 J.K. Harrison – acoustic and electric guitars, bass guitar, piano, keys, loops, percussion, background vocals
 Taylor Mills – background vocals on "It's Perfection"
 Nicholas Markos – electric guitar on "Kindling"
 Tom Wardle – acoustic guitar on "Last Flight Home"
 Michael Bahan – tablas on "Sacred Book Of Favorite Days"
 Kaitlyn Wolfberg – strings
 April Guthrie – strings
 Andrew Shulman – strings

Production
 Producers – Todd Sucherman, J.K. Harrison
 Engineered by J.K. Harrison, JR Taylor
 Mixed by J.K. Harrison, JR Taylor, Todd Sucherman
 Final mix consulting – Steve Dresser
 Mastered by Dave Collins Mastering
 CD/LP Production – Disc Makers
 CD/LP design and graphics – Christopher Markos
 Back photography – Ronn Dunnett
 Cover and insert photography – Todd Sucherman
 Management - Charlie Brusco at Red Light Management

References

External links 
 Song lyrics from Todd Sucherman's website
 Todd Sucherman on the making of "Last Flight Home"

2020 debut albums